Crumpler is a  census-designated place (CDP) located in McDowell County, West Virginia, United States. As of the 2010 census, its population was 204.

History
The community was named after a railroad official.

References

Census-designated places in McDowell County, West Virginia
Census-designated places in West Virginia